Cortez Hankton (born January 20, 1981) is a former American football wide receiver who is currently the wide  receivers coach at  LSU. He was originally signed by the Jacksonville Jaguars as an undrafted free agent in 2003. He played college football at Texas Southern. He attended St. Augustine High School in New Orleans. He lettered in football and track & field. He is a member of Kappa Alpha Psi fraternity.

In 2010, Hankton was nominated for Offensive Player of the Year in the United Football League while playing with the Florida Tuskers.

College career
He is Texas Southern University's record holder for career receiving yards (3,400 yds) and season receiving yards (1,270 yds). He also holds the records for most consecutive games with a receiving touchdown (10 games) and the longest play from scrimmage (99 yd receiving TD) against Texas State University. He finished his college career with 175 receptions and 30 touchdowns.

Professional career

After graduating of Texas Southern in 2002, Hankton was signed as an undrafted free agent in 2003, by the Jacksonville Jaguars.  He proceeded to play in all 16 games as a rookie. He would end up spending four year in Jacksonville. Hankton signed with the Minnesota Vikings in 2007 and spent all of  2008  on injured reserve with the Tampa Bay Buccaneers.

After his NFL career, he signed with the New York Sentinels of the United Football League. The following season he played for the Florida Tuskers under head coach Jay Gruden, and was nominated for the league's Offensive Player of the Year. The Tuskers then moved to Virginia and became the Destroyers for the 2011 season.

Coaching career
Hankton was brought on to Georgia's coaching staff as pass game coordinator and wide receivers coach. Hankton was part of the Georgia staff when the Bulldogs won the National Championship that year over Alabama.

References

External links
Just Sports Stats
Florida Trend Student Spotlight
United Football League Player of the Year Voting
Player Spotlight
Mental Game of Football with Cortez Hankton
Bucs' Hankton Psyched About School
Hankton Pursues MBA While Playing Football

1981 births
Living people
St. Augustine High School (New Orleans) alumni
Sportspeople from New Orleans
Players of American football from New Orleans
American football wide receivers
Texas Southern Tigers football players
Jacksonville Jaguars players
Minnesota Vikings players
Tampa Bay Buccaneers players
New York Sentinels players
Florida Tuskers players
Dartmouth Big Green football coaches
Georgia Bulldogs football coaches